Cyneoterpna is a genus of moths in the family Geometridae erected by Louis Beethoven Prout in 1912.

Species
 Cyneoterpna alpina Goldfinch, 1929
 Cyneoterpna wilsoni (R. Felder & Rogenhofer, 1875)

References

Pseudoterpnini
Geometridae genera
Taxa named by Louis Beethoven Prout
Moths described in 1912